The Southeastern Society of Architectural Historians (also known as SESAH) is a professional organization of academic architectural historians based in the United States.

The organization is the southeast chapter of the Society of Architectural Historians.

Members are predominantly university professors and scholars who gather annually in conferences and have a publication titled Arris.

External links
SESAH's website

Architecture organizations based in the United States
Professional associations based in the United States